Amrit Sagar is a director, producer and writer who works in the Hindi movie industry (Bollywood). He produced and directed his first feature film 1971 in 2007, which won National Film Award for Best Feature Film in Hindi.

Personal life 
He is the grandson of filmmaker Ramanand Sagar and son of producer Moti Sagar.

He studied film-making at California College of Arts where he won the Wood Malcom award for writing.

Career 
Sagar started his career by directing the hit TV show Hatim for Star Plus He produced, directed , and created, Hotel Kingston Star One, Prithviraj Chauhan Star Plus Jai Shri Krishna Colors Meera NDTV Imagine, Shakuntala Star One, Akbar Birbal Big Magic, Dekh Video Dekh DVD Colors TV, Dharam Veer NDTV Imagine  

He produced and directed the 2013 comedy Rabba Main Kya Karoon. He Produced his first Marathi movie Mitwaa in 2015.

Filmography 
1971 (2007)
Rabba Main Kya Karoon (2013)
Mitwaa (2015) (Marathi)

Television 
Hatim (Star Plus)
Hotel Kingston (Star One)
Prithviraj Chauhan (Star Plus)
Jai Shri Krishna (Colors)
Meera (NDTV Imagine)
Shakuntala (Star One)
Akbar Birbal (Big Magic)
Dekh Video Dekh DVD (Colors TV)
Dharam Veer (NDTV Imagine)

Recognition 
 At 55th National Film Awards he won Best Feature Film in Hindi  for 1971
 Best TV show (4 times) at Indian Television Academy Awards and Indian Telly Awards.

References

Sources

 "55th NATIONAL FILM AWARDS FOR THE YEAR 2007" Press Information Bureau (Govt. of India). Archived (PDF) from the original on 7 October 2009. Retrieved 8 September 2009.

Living people
Hindi film producers
Hindi-language film directors
Indian male screenwriters
Year of birth missing (living people)